Andrew Austin can refer to:

 Andrew Austin (cricketer) (born 1997), Irish cricketer
 Andrew Austin (sport shooter) (born 1956), British sport shooter